The National Forces of Liberation (or FNL) is a political party and former rebel group in Burundi. An ethnic Hutu group, the party was previously known as the Party for the Liberation of the Hutu People (Parti pour la libération du peuple Hutu, or PALIPEHUTU) and adhered to a radical Hutu Power ideology, but since the mid- to late-2000s has moderated its stance and cooperated with the Tutsi-supported Union for National Progress party in opposition to the rule of Pierre Nkurunziza and the CNDD-FDD.

PALIPEHUTU was a participant in the Burundian Civil War. Its armed wing was the National Forces of Liberation (Forces nationales de libération, or FNL). It was led by Agathon Rwasa and was estimated to have around 3,000 combatants.

A dissident wing is led by Jean Bosco Sindayigaya.

Formation
PALIPEHUTU was founded in 1980 in refugee camps in Tanzania, where Hutus had fled following persecution by the Tutsi-led government. PALIPEHUTU advocated armed struggle and established its armed wing, the FNL, in 1985. The National Liberation Front (FROLINA) split from PALIPEHUTU in 1990, and the armed wing PALIPEHUTU-FNL, led by Cossan Kabura split from the political wing of PALIPEHUTU in 1991. The political wing of PALIPEHUTU was renamed the Party for the Liberation of People-Agakiza and is led by Etienne Karatasi. In 2002 PALIPEHUTU-FNL split into two factions, one led by Kabura and one by Agathon Rwasa.

Generally, PALIPEHUTU's support comes more from the central region of Muramvya and Lake Tanganyika, whereas the main Hutu political party CNDD derives its support from the southern Bururi region.

Civil war
During the civil war, PALIPEHUTU-FNL was linked to the killing of Monsignor Michael Courtney, the Catholic Church's chief representative in Burundi, the Titanic Express massacre and the Gatumba massacre in which over 150 Banyamulenge Congolese refugees were killed.

PALIPEHUTU also fought in the Second Congo War alongside the Congolese army, the Army for the Liberation of Rwanda and the Mai-Mai against the Burundian army.

Following the Gatumba massacre, the Great Lakes Peace Initiativedeclared PALIPEHUTU-FNL to be a terrorist organisation, and the South African President, Thabo Mbeki called on the International Criminal Court to prosecute.

PALIPEHUTU-FNL was the last Hutu rebel group to sign an agreement with the Burundi government, which it did in September 2006

Further agreements led to a final agreement in December 2008, according to which it also changed its name to remove "PALIPEHUTU" to leave only "FNL" as its name (as Burundian political parties may not refer to ethnicities in their names).

On May 15, 2009, UNICEF reported that 136 ex-FNL child soldiers returned to their communities in Burundi.

Party emblem
The party's emblem a bent bow and an arrow placed between a hoe and a hammer. The party's flag is red with the centre inscribed with the emblem of the party in black. Red symbolizes the suffering endured by the people of Burundi. The bent bow and the arrow symbolize the struggle for the fundamental rights and liberties. The hoe and the hammer, whose handles converges, symbolize the commitment in unity to agricultural and industrial development, respectively. Green symbolizes the hope to set up peace, justice and democracy in Burundi.

References

External links
Forces Nationales de Liberation (FNL) at the Office français de protection des réfugiés et apatrides

Rebel groups in Burundi
Political parties in Burundi
Burundian Civil War
1980 establishments in Burundi
Military units and formations established in 1980
Hutu